St. Peter's Catholic Church is a historic church in Gentilly Township, Minnesota, United States.  The church, built from 1914 to 1915, and the adjacent 1902 rectory were listed on the National Register of Historic Places in 1982.  The church was noted for its exemplary Gothic Revival architecture, and both buildings served as the anchor of a Catholic French Canadian settlement.  St. Peter's celebrated its centennial in 2014 with a renovation project.

References

External links
 Church of St. Peter

Buildings and structures in Polk County, Minnesota
Churches on the National Register of Historic Places in Minnesota
Roman Catholic churches completed in 1915
Churches in the Roman Catholic Diocese of Crookston
National Register of Historic Places in Polk County, Minnesota
20th-century Roman Catholic church buildings in the United States